Steven Howard may refer to:
Steve Howard (politician), Canadian politician and Prince Edward Island Green MLA
Steve Howard (born 1976), Scottish footballer
Steve Howard (baseball) (born 1963), American Major League Baseball outfielder
Steve Howard (sociologist) (born 1953), American sociologist
Steven Howard (politician) (born 1971), American Democratic politician from Vermont

See also
StePHen Howard (disambiguation)